Cryptocapnos is a genus of flowering plants belonging to the family Papaveraceae.

Its native range is Afghanistan.

Species:
 Cryptocapnos chasmophyticus Rech.f.

References

Papaveraceae
Papaveraceae genera